Sílvia Soler i Guasch (born 1961) is a Catalan writer and journalist. In 2013, her novel L’estiu que comença was awarded the Ramon Llull Novel Award.

Early life and education 
Sílvia Soler i Guasch was born on 5 October, 1961, in Figueres. Her mother is the writer Carme Guasch, her brother the journalist Toni Soler i Guasch. She has a degree in information science.

Career 
As a journalist, Soler has worked for the radio, press, and television. She has written for such newspapers as Avui, Punt Diari and Presència. With time, she began to put more focus on book writing.

Soler has written over twenty books, chiefly novels. Her fiction debut, Semblava de vidre (1984), won the Recull award. She is also the recipient of premi Fiter i Rossell for Mira’m als ulls and the Prudenci Bertrana Prize for Petons de diumenge. In 2013, Soler was awarded the Ramon Llull Novel Award for L’estiu que comença, a novel about a fifty years long friendship between a man and a woman.

Soler's novel 39+1. L’edat en què una dona sap que l’home de la seva vida és ella mateixa (2005) was adapted for television.

Works

Fiction 

 Semblava de vidre,1984
 Arriben els ocells de nit, 1985
 Ramblejar, 1992
 El centre exacte de la nit, 1992
 El son dels volcans, 1999
 L’arbre de Judes, 2001
 Mira’m als ulls, 2004
 39+1. L’edat en què una dona sap que l’home de la seva vida és ella mateixa, 2005
 39+1+1: Enamorar-se és fàcil, si saps com, 2007
 Petons de diumenge, 2008
 Una família fora de sèrie, 2010
 Un creuer fora de sèrie, 2012
 Bàsquet, scrabble i tu, 2012 (young adult fiction written with son, Ferran Muñoz)
 L’estiu que comença, 2013
 Un any i mig, 2015
 Els vells amics, 2017
 Rellotges de sol, 2018
 El fibló, 2019
 Nosaltres, després, 2021

Non-fiction 

 Àngel Casas Show: anecdotari secret, 1983
 El gust de ser mare, 2004

References 

Women writers from Catalonia
Journalists from Catalonia
Novelists from Catalonia
Catalan-language writers
20th-century Spanish women writers
21st-century Spanish women writers
People from Figueres
Living people
1961 births